Griselda is an opera seria in three acts by the Italian composer Alessandro Scarlatti, the last of Scarlatti’s operas to survive completely today. The libretto is by Apostolo Zeno, with revisions by an anonymous author. Zeno wrote his work in 1701 and it had already been set by Pollarolo and Antonio Maria Bononcini (Tomaso Albinoni, Giovanni Bononcini and Antonio Vivaldi would later produce versions). It is based on the story of Patient Griselda from Boccaccio's tenth day of The Decameron. Scarlatti's opera was first performed at the Teatro Capranica, Rome, in January 1721 with an all-male cast (five castratos and a tenor).

Roles

Synopsis

Act 1
Years before the action begins, Gualtiero, King of Sicily, had married a poor shepherdess, Griselda. The marriage was deeply unpopular with the king's subjects and when a daughter, Costanza, was born, the king had to pretend to have her killed while secretly sending her to be brought up by Prince Corrado of Apulia. Now, faced with another rebellion from the Sicilians, Gualtiero is forced to renounce Griselda and promises to take a new wife. The proposed bride is in fact Costanza, who is unaware of her true parentage. She is in love with Corrado's younger brother, Roberto, and the thought of being forced to marry Gualtiero drives her to despair.

Act 2
Griselda returns to her home in the countryside where she is pursued by the courtier Ottone, who is in love with her. She angrily rejects his advances. Gualtiero and his followers go out hunting and come across Griselda's cottage. Gualtiero foils an attempt by Ottone to kidnap Griselda and allows her back to the court, but only as Costanza's slave.

Act 3
Ottone still resolutely pursues Griselda and Gualtiero promises him her hand as soon as he himself has married Costanza. Griselda declares she would rather die and, moved by her faithfulness, Gualtiero takes her back as his wife. He reveals the true identity of Costanza and allows her to marry Roberto.

Recordings
Griselda – Lawrence Zazzo, Dorothea Röschmann, Veronica Cangemi, Silvia Tro Santafé, Kobie van Rensburg, Bernarda Fink, Akademie für Alte Musik Berlin conducted by René Jacobs (Harmonia Mundi, 2003)

References

Further reading

 The Viking Opera Guide, ed. Amanda Holden (Viking, 1993)
 Dorsi, Frabrizio & Rausa, Giuseppe, Storia dell'opera italiana, Torino, B. Mondadori, 2000, pp. 75–76.  (in Italian)
 Libretto: Griselda : Dramma per Musica, Roma : Tinassi, 1721 (excerpt in italianopera.org, accessed 5 July 2011) (in Italian)
 Del Teatro (in Italian)
 Work details, ''Magazine de l'opéra baroque (in French)
 Booklet notes to the Jacobs recording

External links

Operas by Alessandro Scarlatti
Italian-language operas
Opera seria
1721 operas
Operas
Operas based on books
The Decameron
Operas based on works by Giovanni Boccaccio